Valentin Kouamé is a Burkinabé professional football player.

Honours
 ES Sétif
 Algerian Cup 
 Winner: 2011–12
 Algerian Ligue Professionnelle 1
 Winner: 2011–12

References

External links
 
 Valentin Kouamé at Footballdatabase
 

1990 births
Burkinabé footballers
Burkinabé expatriate footballers
Living people
Algerian Ligue Professionnelle 1 players
Luxembourg National Division players
Étoile Filante de Ouagadougou players
MC Saïda players
Jeunesse Esch players
Sportspeople from Ouagadougou
Association football midfielders
Expatriate footballers in Algeria
Expatriate footballers in Belgium
Expatriate footballers in Luxembourg
Burkinabé expatriate sportspeople in Algeria
Burkinabé expatriate sportspeople in Belgium
Burkinabé expatriate sportspeople in Luxembourg
21st-century Burkinabé people
Francs Borains players